John Mark Winters (born 24 October 1960) is an English former professional footballer who played in the Football League, as a right back.

External links
Profile at Neil Brown

1960 births
Living people
People from Wisbech
English footballers
Association football defenders
Peterborough United F.C. players
Nuneaton Borough F.C. players
Peterborough Northern Star F.C. players
English Football League players